Fukushima 50 is a pseudonym given by English-language media to a group of employees at the Fukushima Daiichi Nuclear Power Plant. Following the Tōhoku earthquake and tsunami on 11 March 2011, a related series of nuclear accidents resulted in melting of the cores of three reactors. These 50 employees remained on-site after 750 other workers were evacuated.

After TEPCO management proposed withdrawing all its employees from the plant on 14 March, additional manpower was deployed from around Japan. Some workers traveled on clear roads by convoy from Tokyo. When they arrived, hundreds of firemen, SDF personnel and employees of TEPCO, convened  from the plant and debated how to best stabilize the plant. On the night of 15 March, these workers joined the original Fukushima 50. Despite the incorrect figure of workers, the Fukushima 50 has remained the pseudonym used by media to refer to the group of workers at Fukushima reflecting the solitary nature of the role.

The number of the workers involved rose to 580 on the morning of 18 March as staff from the Kashiwazaki-Kariwa Nuclear Power Plant and workers installing the new power line joined in. More than 1,000 workers, firefighters, and soldiers toiled at the site on 23 March. The Fukushima 50 were drawn from Toshiba, Hitachi, Kajima, firefighters from Tokyo, Osaka, Yokohama, Kawasaki, Nagoya and Kyoto, TEPCO and its subsidiaries such as Kandenko, TEP Industry and TEP Environmental Engineering, and many small-to-mid-size companies that have contracts with these big companies.

Over 20 workers had been injured by 18 March, including one who was exposed to a large amount of ionizing radiation when the worker tried to vent vapour from a valve of the containment building. Three more workers were exposed to radiation over 100 mSv, and two of them were sent to a hospital due to beta burns on 24 March. Two other workers, Kazuhiko Kokubo, 24, and Yoshiki Terashima, 21, were killed by the tsunami while conducting emergency repairs immediately after the quake. Their bodies were found on 30 March.

The workers and volunteers were assigned the mission of stabilizing the reactors.
Their activities included assessing the damage and radiation levels caused by the explosions, cooling stricken reactors with seawater, and preventing any risk of fire. These workers remained on-site despite serious risks of radiation poisoning. Levels of radiation on site are far higher than in the  exclusion zone and media outlets reported that the severity of the situation could have grave implications on their future health, with possibly fatal consequences for the workers. On 18 March, according to Prime Minister Naoto Kan the workers were "prepared for death".

On 14 March, a complete withdrawal proposed by TEPCO was rejected by the prime minister, to continue attempts at bringing the reactors under control during the Fukushima Daiichi nuclear disaster.

Conditions

Working environment
The workers ate and slept in shifts in a two-story earthquake-resistant building at the center of the complex constructed in July 2010, about "the size of an average living room."

A daily schedule at Fukushima I nuclear plant, according to the article on 28 March.

During some work, in high radiation areas, the workers were limited to 15-minute sessions inside the damaged buildings.

Radiation
The international limit for radiation exposure for nuclear workers is 20 millisievert (20 mSv, or 2 rem) per year, averaged over five years, with a limit of 50 mSv in any one year. However, for workers performing emergency services, the United States Environmental Protection Agency (EPA) guidance on dose limits is 100 mSv when "protecting valuable property" and 250 mSv when the activity is "life saving or protection of large populations."

Prior to the accident, the maximum permissible dose for Japanese nuclear workers was 100 mSv in any one year, but on 15 March 2011, the Japanese Health and Labor Ministry enforced the permitted 250 mSv limit, in light of the situation at the Fukushima Nuclear Power Plant. However, the workers at Fukushima plant declined the elevated 250 mSv limit and kept adopting the previous 100 mSv. Tokyo Enesys, a TEPCO's subsidiary, adopts 80 mSv to manage the radiation level monitoring with some buffer. Kandenko, Kajima and Taisei Corporation adopted 100 mSv. Hitachi rewrote internal rule as 200 mSv. TEPCO decided to move workers around 200mSv to low-radiated site while its subsidiaries, Tokyo Enesys and Kandenko, adopted limits around 100mSv. Over 30 workers were radiated beyond 100 mSv by 23 April 2011.

According to the Guardian, the Fukushima workers had to be wary of radiation spiking—a sudden and unforeseen rise in radiation. This threat forced the workers to evacuate for a short period of time on the morning of Tuesday 15 March 2011 when radiation detected at Fukushima rose to approximately 1000 mSv/h, the highest level of radiation detected at any point of time during the accident at the plant.

The workers wore hazmat suits and hazmat masks, carrying dosimeters that alerted at 80 millisieverts. Each worker had to stop the operation once the dosimeter alerted. According to TEPCO, seven TEPCO workers were exposed to radiation over the limit of 100 millisievert by the morning of 20 March.

In context, immediate symptoms become apparent if exposed to above 250 mSv per day. Symptoms include nausea and loss of appetite as well as damage to bone marrow, lymph nodes and the spleen. Generally, these symptoms become more severe and noticeable in the 1000 to 3000 mSv bracket with recovery probable, but not assured. New and more serious symptoms appear above 3000 mSv such as peeling of the skin, hemorrhaging and sterility with death if left untreated.

Explosions

The Fukushima 50 were present when hydrogen explosions occurred at the reactor buildings of units 1, 3, and 4. Five workers were injured in the unit 1 explosion at 15:36 on 12 March. Most of the injuries were not severe. Eleven workers were injured in the unit 3 explosion at 11:01 on 14 March. The explosion at unit 4 at about 6am on 15 March did not cause injuries. The explosions scattered radioactive concrete debris around the buildings, which made the working conditions on the site more difficult.

Number of workers

Originally there were approximately 800 workers on 11 March 2011, the day the earthquake and tsunami struck. On 15 March, workers deemed non-essential were withdrawn by the Tokyo Electric Power Company.  A total of around 750 workers left due to increased risk and consequently left around 50. It was on this day that the media started to call the remaining workers the "Fukushima 50".

However, on the morning of 16 March, the remaining workers had to be evacuated for a brief period of time due to a radiation spike which was detected which could be harmful to the workers' health. It was reported that when they returned to the plant, a further 130 or so workers joined their colleagues to total of around 180 to stabilize the reactors. The number of workers rose to 580 on the morning of 18 March. By 12 April, approximately 700 workers were working on-site.

By 21 March 2011, Toshiba had sent a 100-strong team to two Fukushima plants as part of a task-force of 700 Toshiba workers organized at Toshiba's Isogo Engineering Centre to defuse the nuclear crisis, and Hitachi had dispatched 120 to Fukushima I and formed a 1000-strong task force.

Referring to the original 50 workers, nuclear researcher Dr. Eric Hall opined that they were likely to be older, and unlikely to have further children, so the long-term effects of exposure to high-levels of ionizing radiation would be less likely to appear before a natural death. Some younger workers were injured and young Osaka firefighters were operating at the site. A group of 250 skilled senior citizens volunteered to work in the radioactive environment, citing reduced harm to them.

Team leader Masao Yoshida died of esophageal cancer in 2013, but the cancer was likely to be unrelated to the event at Fukushima, as development typically takes 5–10 years.

*: task finished

Injury
Over 20 workers were injured by 18 March. Three workers were exposed to radiation and two were rushed to a hospital with up to 180 mSv, which is less than the maximum 250 mSv that the government allowed for workers at the plant. Both workers, one in his twenties and one in his thirties, were from Kandenko and were regular workers at Fukushima II nuclear power plant. Another worker was from a contract company of Kandenko.

Cooperation

Reaction of media and public
Media outlets lauded the remaining workers' bravery, and called them "heroes", and as a result they have become known in the media as the "Fukushima 50". France 24 called them "Japan's faceless heroes", British newspaper, The Guardian wrote: "Other nuclear power employees, as well as the wider population, can only look on in admiration". They have been compared to the Forty-seven Ronin. In Hong Kong, a group of netizens at HKGolden Forum dedicated Cantonese and Japanese lyrics based on a Cantopop song, entitled "福島烈士─向福島50人致敬" (Martyr of Fukushima - Tribute to the Fukushima Fifty), to the workers.

According to Robert Hetkämper, a correspondent for the German television network ARD, the label "Fukushima 50" was invented by a foreign newspaper, and then was imported by the Japanese media. The "Fukushima 50" would include engineers as well as unskilled workers, and there would be grounds to suspect that many workers were not really aware of the dangers of their assignment.

Awards
On 7 September 2011, the "Fukushima Heroes" were honored with the Prince of Asturias Award for Peace, an award given by the Crown Prince of Spain.

See also
 Hymn to The Fukushima 50
 Liquidator (Chernobyl) - name given to workers who were employed to contain the damage resulting from the Chernobyl disaster
 Lists of nuclear disasters and radioactive incidents
 Masao Yoshida (nuclear engineer)
 Nuclear labor issues
 Radiation effects from Fukushima Daiichi nuclear disaster
 Timeline of the Fukushima I nuclear accidents#Tuesday, 15 March

References

External links
Fukushima heroes: Not afraid to die - from CBS News
Japan hails the heroic 'Fukushima 50' - from BBC News
Fukushima 50  A Facebook page to pay tribute to their heroic acts
Hymn to The Fukushima 50 - Tribute  A powerful and thought-provoking video paying tribute to the Fukushima Heroes
Official released video footage from Tokyo Fire Department captured at Fukushima on March 18th, 2011.

Fukushima Daiichi nuclear disaster
Radiation health effects
Tokyo Electric Power Company
Asia Game Changer Award winners